Harefield United Football Club are an English football club based in Harefield in the London Borough of Hillingdon. The club is the oldest in Middlesex. The club is affiliated to the Middlesex County Football Association. They are currently members
of the Combined Counties Premier North Division as of the 2022-2023 season, having left the Spartan South Midlands League Premier Division at the end of the 2021-2022 season.

History

The club was formed in 1868 and in their early years played under several names including Harefield Victoria (circa 1891) and Breakspear Institute (circa 1903–1922), and played in the local Uxbridge Leagues. In 1934 the club merged with Harefield FC to become Harefield United, and played in the Uxbridge & District League.

After the war the club moved to the Great Western Combination in 1947, winning the league once in the 1950–51 season. After the Great Western Comibuination league the club played in the Parthenon League in 1964, and winning the league in their debut season. Two seasons later they joined the Middlesex league in 1966. During their 5 seasons in the Middlesex league the club went on to win the league title four times and the league cup twice.

In the 1971–72 season the club then joined the Spartan League – Senior Section, staying there for four seasons, while also making their Debut in the FA Vase in the 1974–75 season, before joining division two of the Athenian league for the start of the 1975–76 season. The club made their debut in the FA Cup in the 1979–80 season. After nine seasons in the Athenian league the club joined the Isthmian League Division Two North for two seasons before switching to Division two south. The club then spent seven seasons in Division Two South, which was renamed to just Division two in 1991, suffering relegation at the end of this period to Division three. The club then remained in Division three until the 1996–97 season when they left the Isthmian league to join the Spartan league, due to a lack of funds to carry out necessary ground improvements required for the Isthmian league.

A season after joining the Spartan league, they became founder members of the Spartan South Midlands League Premier Division South, when the London Spartan League and the South Midlands League merged. A season later after another league re-organisation they were placed in the Senior Division, which after three seasons was renamed division one. The club in the newly named Division one finished as runners-up that year, and won the League Cup. With the club for the 2002–03 season now in the premier division, they competed in the Premier League Cup, finishing as runners-up at their first attempt. The club also had more success that year by winning the Challenge trophy beating Dunstable Town 4–1 over two legs. Further cup success continued the following season with the club winning the Premier League Cup, overcoming Brook House in the final and getting beaten 2–1 (aet) by Wealdstone in the Middlesex Senior Charity Cup.

The club has since remained in the Spartan South Midlands League Premier Division finishing runners-up twice, in the 2006–07 season and the 2008–09 season where they lost out on goal difference against Biggleswade Town.

Manager Ian Crane left to join A.F.C. Hayes in the summer of 2012, and he was replaced by Uxbridge reserve boss Phil Granville. However, Granville left in the summer of 2015 to become Hanwell Town's manager and he was replaced by Jason Shaw in May 2015.

In the 2018-19 season, Jason Shaw led Harefield United to promotion from the Spartan South Midlands League Division One with five games to spare in his fourth season with the club.  The club went the whole league season unbeaten.

Ground

Harefield United play their games at Preston Park, Breakspear Road North, Harefield UB9 6NE.

In 2010 the ground won the Steps 5 and 6 National Award for Groundsman of the year.

Current squad

Non-playing staff
As of February 2023

Managerial history

 Jason Shaw	2015-
 Phil Granville	2012-2015
 Ian Crane	Dec 2011-2012
 Graham Goode 2010-2011
 Darren Feighery 2009-2010
 Glen Bellis	2007-2009
 Stuart Leavy	1999-2007
 Vic Harris  1997-1999
 Tony Choules	1995-1997

Notable former players
For all Harefield United F.C. players with a Wikipedia article, see

Club honours

League honours
Spartan South Midlands Football League Premier Division :
 Runners-up: 2006–07, 2008–09
Spartan South Midlands Football League Division One:
 Winners: 2018-2019 
Spartan South Midlands Football League Division One:
 Runners-up: 2001–02
Great Western Combination league Division One:
 Winners: 1950–51
Great Western Combination league Division Two:
 Winners: 1947–48
Parthenon league :
 Winners: 1964–65

Cup honours
Middlesex Premier Cup:
 Winners: 2018-2019 
Middlesex Senior Cup:
 Runners-up: 2020–21
Middlesex Senior Charity Cup:
 Runners-up: 2003–04
Chesham Cup:
 Winners: 1947–48
Spartan South Midlands Football League Cup:
 Winners: 2001–02
Spartan South Midlands Football League Challenge Trophy:
 Winners: 2002–03
Spartan South Midlands Football League Premier League Cup:
 Runners-up: 2002–03

Club records

Highest league position: 5th in Isthmian league Division Two South 1988–89
FA Cup best performance: Second qualifying round 1980–81, 1986–87, 1987–88, 2002–03, 2009–10
FA Vase best performance: Semi Final 1989–90
Highest attendance: 497 vs Hatfield Town 2018-2019

References

External links
Website

Spartan South Midlands Football League
Combined Counties Football League
Association football clubs established in 1868
Parthenon League
Isthmian League
Athenian League
Football clubs in Hertfordshire
1868 establishments in England
Football clubs in England
Sport in the London Borough of Hillingdon